P07 was an important Ukraine regional road (P-Highway) in the Kharkiv and Luhansk Oblasts of Donbas, Ukraine. It ran west–east and connected Chuhuiv near Kharkiv through Starobilsk with Milove on the border with Russia.  It passed either through or near Malynivka, Korobochkyne, Doslidne-Chkalovs'ke, and Havrylivka in Chuhuiv Raion; Khudoyarove, Shevchenkove, Pervomais'ke, Starovirivka, Hrushivka-Vasylivka-Osad'kivka (Prokopivka station), Kupiansk, Petropavlivka, and Kyslivka in Kupiansk Raion; Berestova station, Novoselivs'ke-Kuzemivka, Uchnivs'kyi station, Kryvoshyivka, Pidkuichans'k, Kryvoshyivka station, Kalynivka station, Kolomyichykha, Zmiivka, Honcharivka station, Svatove, Petrivka, and Mistky, in Svativskyi; Dzhelmil'ne, Kalykivka, Levadne, Krynychky, Starobilsk, Vyshneve, Stepove, and Orikhove in Starobilskyi; Yevsuh, Pryvil'ne-Parneve, Bilovodsk, and Novospasivka in Bilovodskyi; Striltsivka, Novostriltsivka, Zarichne, Velykotska, Travneve, Chertkovo station (Rostovskaya), Ukraine-Russia border in Milovskyi.

On 9 August 2017, the P07 was redesignated as H26.

War in Donbas
Significant armed conflict has occurred along and near the P07 during the Russo-Ukrainian War.

In Starobilsk, on July 12, 2014, Russian backed terrorists partially damaged a bridge over the Aidar River.

Main route

Main route and connections to/intersections with other highways in Ukraine.

See also

 Roads in Ukraine

References

External links
Regional Roads in Ukraine in Russian

Roads in Kharkiv Oblast
Roads in Luhansk Oblast